Quarantine stations have been in use in the U.S. since 1799, when a center was built for yellow fever containment in Philadelphia, Pennsylvania. The National Quarantine Act was instituted in 1878, resulting in other centers on the U.S. The Southern Atlantic Quarantine Station was created in 1880.

History

The Southern Atlantic Quarantine Station (SAQS) was created on Blackbeard Island by the US Navy, and operated between 1880 and 1910. Its purpose was to monitor shipping to several cities, the largest of which was Savannah Georgia. The main purpose was to prevent yellow fever, a mosquito-borne illness imported from tropical sources. 13 buildings were employed in the goal of disinfecting ships before proceeding to the mainland. The main disinfectant used was sulfur dioxide.

References

Buildings and structures in McIntosh County, Georgia
Quarantine facilities in the United States
Government buildings in Georgia (U.S. state)